Erik Tommy Nilsson  (born 11 March 1960) is a Swedish singer, songwriter and actor.

Career 
In the late 1970s, Nilsson was the singer of Swedish heavy metal band Horizont. The group released two albums but a French producer, Yves Accary, contacted Nilsson and signed him to a French record company. The singer enjoyed his first big hit in France in 1981 with the song "No Way No How". The single sold one million copies and the album 200 000 copies. No Way No How, his first album, included disco tracks and ballads. A follow up LP Tommy Nilsson was released in 1982 and this time the songs were composed by Tommy Nilsson and Alex R Contanstinos. This was a rock album, recorded in Stockholm and Los Angeles, but it did not sell very well and after two years of travelling between France and the United States, Nilsson decided to go back to Sweden.

He first joined another metal band, Easy Action, and recorded one album with them That makes One . The group eventually split up and Nilsson started a solo career. He represented Sweden in the Eurovision Song Contest 1989 with the ballad En dag (One day) and placed fourth. He has also made several Swedish hits in Sweden; Allt som jag känner (Everything that I feel) (a duet with Tone Norum) in 1987, Öppna din dörr (Open your door) in 1994, Dina färger var blå (Your colours were blue) in 1996, and Amelia in 2005. In 1988, he was given an award for best Swedish male artist and in 1994 received a gold disc for his album En Kvinnas Man.

In 1997, Nilsson co-starred with Mary Wilson of the Supremes in "Supreme Soul", the story of a black singer who arrives in Sweden to do a show with a white singer. The show consisted of music, as well as humorous moments that highlighted culture differences between Sweden and the United States of America. In 2001, a compilation of his songs En samling 1981-2001, went platinum in Sweden. Nilsson has also collaborated with Swedish television, dubbed cartoons, and acted in several plays. In 2005, his album Tiden före nu reached # 2 on the Swedish sales chart just after its release.

Nilsson took part in the Swedish national Eurovision Song Contest selection again in 2007. He performed the power ballad Jag tror på människan (I believe in man) in Melodifestivalen 2007's first semi final in Jönköping on 3 February 2007, and qualified for the final round, along with Anna Book. The song placed tenth and last in the final after failing to receive any points from the judges or the televoting audience. Nevertheless, Jag tror på människan reached #9 on the Svensktoppen.

The singer played the part of Captain von Trapp in the musical The Sound of Music that ran in Stockholm beginning 29 September 2007, ending with a tour and the last performance in Örebro in May 2008. Nilsson has been married to the Swedish actress Malin Berghagen.

Nilsson is also known for his dubbing work for animated films and series, including Bonkers (TV series), Top Cat, Batman: The Animated Series, The Busy World of Richard Scarry, the voice of Patrick Star in SpongeBob SquarePants, among others. He dubbed Mel Gibson's voice of John Smith in Pocahontas.

In 2016, he participated in Så mycket bättre, which was broadcast on TV4. He also participated in the Swedish show Stjärnornas stjärna in 2018, broadcast on the same channel. 

Since 2017, he is married to actress Linda Olsson.

He is back in the band Easy Action since 2019.

Discography

Albums
Studio albums

Compilation albums 

Other albums
2010: I år är julen min (Christmas album)

Singles

Other singles
1981: "In the Mean Meantimes" / "No Way No How"
1981: "Radio Me"
1987: "My Summer With You" (with Tone Norum)
1990: "Too Many Expectations"
1990: "Looking Through the Eyes of a Child"
1990: "Don't Walk Away"
1991: "Long Lasting Love"
1994: "En kvinnas man"
1994: "Lämnar du mig"
1994: "Marianne"
1996: "Om jag är den du vill ha"
1996: "Å så nära"
1996: "Du är för mig"
1999: "Din skugga på mitt täcke"
2001: "När du är här"
2002: "Nu är tid att leva" (with Åsa Jinder)
2005: "Amelia"
2005: "Allt ditt hjärta är"
2006: "Vi brann"
2016: "Håll mitt hjärta hårt" (with Patrik Isaksson and Uno Svenningsson as Patrik, Tommy & Uno (Melodifestivalen 2016) 
2016: "My Love Is Not Blind"
2016: "Det sitter i dig"

Citations

External links 

 
 
 

1960 births
Living people
Eurovision Song Contest entrants for Sweden
Eurovision Song Contest entrants of 1989
Swedish rock singers
Melodifestivalen winners
Swedish male singers
Swedish-language singers
Easy Action (band) members
Melodifestivalen contestants of 2016
Melodifestivalen contestants of 2007
Melodifestivalen contestants of 2006
Melodifestivalen contestants of 1989